Batu Talam is a mukim in Raub District, Pahang, Malaysia. Following the history of Pahang, Batu Talam was opened by Tok De Abdul Rahman as a settlement around the 1720s.

Notable events
1993 – Former Pahang's DUN Batu Talam assemblyman Dato' Mazlan Idris was murdered by Mona Fandey, Affandy, and Juraimi.
2007 – Batu Talam becomes the first constituency in Malaysia to have had two by-elections, after a by-election is held to replace Tengku Paris Tengku Razlan upon his death. Barisan Nasional retained the Batu Talam seat in this by-election.

References

Raub District
Mukims of Pahang
Towns in Pahang